Doctor
Abdul Ahmad Zahedi Niqala
came to serve to represent Ghazni Province in Afghanistan's Meshrano Jirga, the lower house of its National Legislature, in 2005.

He is a member of the Hazara ethnic group.
He practiced medicine first for an aid group
from Sweden, and then in private practice
in Qarabaqh.

References

Politicians of Ghazni Province
Members of the House of the People (Afghanistan)
Living people
Year of birth missing (living people)